Gießenbach may refer to:

 Gießenbach (Danube), a river of Austria, tributary of the Danube
 Gießenbach (Kieferbach), a river of Bavaria, Germany, tributary of the Kieferbach
 Gießenbach, a district of Scharnitz, a municipality in Tyrol, Austria
 Lohbach (Inn), a river of Austria, tributary of the Inn, a part of it is called Gießenbach

See also
 Gessenbach, a river of Thuringia, Germany